Here and Now is a daily Canadian radio show, which airs on CBLA-FM in Toronto, Ontario.

Under CBC Radio One's policy of extended local programming in metropolitan markets, the program airs from 3 to 6 p.m. on CBLA's primary transmitter in Toronto, pre-empting the 3 to 4 p.m. hour of network programming. However, CBLA's rebroadcast transmitters elsewhere in Southern Ontario do not air the first hour of Here and Now, remaining with the network programs and joining Here and Now in progress at 4 p.m.

History
The program debuted under its current title in 1997, concurrently with the network's rebranding from "CBC Radio" to "CBC Radio One". Its first host was slated to be Maureen Taylor, but she left the network for TVOntario before the program's launch, and the program debuted with Joan Melanson as host. Melanson took a maternity leave in 1998, and Erika Ritter took over the program as a guest host.

The program was hosted by Avril Benoît from 1999 to 2004 and by Matt Galloway from 2004 until February 8, 2010; Galloway moved to hosting Metro Morning effective March 1, 2010. From February 2010 through December 2010, interim hosts included Robin Brown, Jane Hawtin, Karen Horsman, and Kevin Sylvester.

On December 16, 2010, broadcaster Laura Di Battista was announced as the new host starting January 3, 2011. Her tenure lasted until November 2012, when CBC spokesperson Chuck Thompson announced that Battista was out. At the time, no successor was made public; in the interim, Brown, Hawtin, Horsman, Sylvester, Gill Deacon and Mary Ito served as guest hosts. On May 31, 2013, the CBC announced Deacon as the new permanent host, starting September 2, 2013. Deacon spent a year away from the show beginning in fall 2018 after being diagnosed with breast cancer; the show was guest-hosted through much of 2019 by Reshmi Nair, Saroja Coelho, Nana aba Duncan or Angeline Tetteh-Wayoe, and Deacon returned to the show in early September 2019.

Personalities associated with the show include Trevor Dunn with local news reports, Colette Kennedy covering weather and Khalil Hassanali with traffic updates.

See also
 CBC Radio One local programming

References

External links
 Here and Now

CBC Radio One programs
Canadian talk radio programs
1997 radio programme debuts